Chlorphoxime is an insecticide used as crop protection active ingredient. Chlorphoxime is also a cholinesterase inhibitor and a neurotoxin.

Properties 
A study was conducted to investigate the effect of chlorophoxime for the control of fleas in kangaroo rats and hispid cotton rats. Chlorphoxime was found to be effective.

In another study, the efficacy of some insecticides was investigated on certain storage pests. While phoxim, bioresmethrin and fenitrothion showed strong activity against the red-brown rice mealybug, the insecticidal activity of chlorphoxim and permethrin was low.

Production 
The synthesis of chlorophoxime is described in the following reaction sequence:

Trade names 
A crop protection product containing the active ingredient chlorophoxime is marketed under the trade name Baythion.

Approval 
No plant protection products containing chlorophoxime are approved in the European Union or Switzerland.

References

Chlorobenzenes
Oxime esters
Nitriles
Thiophosphoryl compounds
Ethyl esters